Sead Salahović (born 24 October 1977) is a Serbian former professional footballer.

External links
 
 Profile at Royal Antwerp official website
 
 

Living people
1977 births
People from Prizren
Bosniaks of Serbia
Serbian footballers
Serbian expatriate footballers
FK Palilulac Beograd players
FK Zvezdara players
FK Obilić players
FC Spartak Vladikavkaz players
Russian Premier League players
Expatriate footballers in Russia
Royal Antwerp F.C. players
Belgian Pro League players
Expatriate footballers in Belgium
FK Belasica players
Expatriate footballers in North Macedonia
FC Kryvbas Kryvyi Rih players
Ukrainian Premier League players
Expatriate footballers in Ukraine
Association football forwards